The 2022 Belmont Stakes was the 154th running of the Belmont Stakes and the 111th time the event would take place at Belmont Park in Elmont, New York. The  race, known as the "test of the champion", is the final leg in the American Triple Crown, open to three-year-old Thoroughbreds.  The race was won by Mo Donegal.

The race took place on Saturday, June 11, with an actual start time of 6:44 p.m. EDT; television coverage was on NBC. It was a Grade I stakes race with a purse of $1.5 million.

The race was run without a Triple Crown at stake, as the Kentucky Derby and Preakness Stakes had already been won by different horses: Kentucky Derby winner Rich Strike bypassed the Preakness (and gave up the chance to become Triple Crown winner), while Preakness winner Early Voting did not enter the Kentucky Derby or the Belmont Stakes. 

Also, none of the horses competing ran in all three Triple Crown races (thereby making this year's Triple Crown irrelevant).

Field
A field of eight was drawn for the Belmont Stakes on Tuesday, June 7; We The People was installed as the favorite at 2-1. Mo Donegal, who finished fifth in the Kentucky Derby, is the second choice pick at 5-2, while Derby winner Rich Strike is the third choice pick at 7-2. Nest, the only filly in the field, looked to become the fourth filly to win the Belmont Stakes; the last was Rags to Riches in 2007.

Result

ƒ Filly
  
Track: Fast

Times:  mile – 23.99;  mile – 48.49;  mile – 1:13.23; mile – 1:37.74;  miles – 2:03.06; final – 2:28.28

Splits for each quarter-mile: (24:50) (24:74) (24:51) (25:32) (25:22)

Source:

Payouts

 $1 Exacta: (6–3) $13.80
 $1 Trifecta: (6–3–2) $187.50
 $1 Superfecta: (6–3–2–1) $692.00

Source:

References

External links

Belmont Stakes races
Belmont Stakes
Belmont Stakes
Belmont Stakes
Belmont Stakes